Gunnarshaugen  is a mountain of Viken, in southern Norway.

Mountains of Viken